Kosmos 1367 ( meaning Cosmos 1367) was a Soviet US-K missile early warning satellite which was launched in 1982 as part of the Soviet military's Oko programme. The satellite was designed to identify missile launches using optical telescopes and infrared sensors.

Kosmos 1367 was launched from Site 41/1 at Plesetsk Cosmodrome in the Russian SSR. A Molniya-M carrier rocket with a 2BL upper stage was used to perform the launch, which took place at 13:09 UTC on 20 May 1982. The launch successfully placed the satellite into a molniya orbit. It subsequently received its Kosmos designation, and the international designator 1982-045A. The United States Space Command assigned it the Satellite Catalog Number 13205.

See also

 1982 in spaceflight
 List of Kosmos satellites (1251–1500)
 List of Oko satellites
 List of R-7 launches (1980-1984)

References

Kosmos satellites
Oko
Spacecraft launched in 1982
Spacecraft launched by Molniya-M rockets